The Myamyinzu Pagoda is a Buddhist pagoda located in Tesu village, Myanmar.

References

Pagodas in Myanmar
Buildings and structures in Mandalay Region